Samuel Eyres (1885 – 31 October 1917) was an English professional footballer who played as a forward in the Football League for Manchester City.

Personal life
Eyres served as a gunner in the Royal Field Artillery during the First World War. He was killed during the Battle of Passchendaele on 31 October 1917 and is buried at Ypres Reservoir Cemetery.

Career statistics

References

1885 births
Date of birth missing
1917 deaths
People from Droylsden
Footballers from Greater Manchester
Association football forwards
English footballers
English Football League players
Manchester City F.C. players
British Army personnel of World War I
Royal Field Artillery soldiers
British military personnel killed in World War I
English Freemasons
Burials in Commonwealth War Graves Commission cemeteries in Belgium